Cheong Wa Dae, also known as the Blue House, is a public park that formerly served as the executive office and official residence of the president of South Korea from 1948 to 2022. It is located in the Jongno district of the South Korean capital Seoul.

Cheong Wa Dae is in fact, a complex of multiple buildings, built largely in the traditional Korean architectural style with some modern architectural elements and facilities. Cheong Wa Dae now consists of the Main Office Hall Bon-gwan (lit. "Main House"), the Presidential Residence, the State Reception House Yeongbin-gwan (lit. "Welcome-Guest House"), the Chunchu-gwan (lit. "Spring-Autumn House") Press Hall, and the Secretariat Buildings. The entire complex covers approximately 250,000 square metres or 62 acres.

Cheong Wa Dae was built upon the site of the royal garden of the Joseon Dynasty (1392–1910). While the Blue House served as an executive office, it was one of the most protected official residences in Asia. Upon the inauguration of President Yoon Suk-yeol in May 2022, Cheong Wa Dae was relieved of its duties as the official residence and executive office of the president and was fully converted to a public park.

History
The location of Cheong Wa Dae was the site of a royal villa in what was then Hanyang, the southern capital of the Goryeo dynasty (918–1392). It was built by King Sukjong (r. 1095–1105) in 1104. Goryeo's principal capital was at Kaesong, and it also maintained a western capital at Pyongyang and an eastern capital at Gyeongju.

After the Joseon Dynasty (1392–1897) moved its capital to Hanyang, Gyeongbokgung was built in 1395, the fourth year of the reign of King Taejo (r. 1392–1398) as the main palace, and the royal villa lot became the back garden of the palace. It was used as the site for civil service examinations and military training.

Following Japan's annexation of Korea in 1910, the Japanese governor of Korea used the Gyeongbokgung grounds for the Government-General Building. In July 1939, Japan built an official residence/office for the governor-general on the site of Cheong Wa Dae.

With the establishments of the Republic of Korea in 1948, President Syngman Rhee called the building "Gyeong Mu Dae" (Hanja:), which was the name of one of the few old buildings for former official residence there. He used it as his office and residence. President Yun Bo-seon changed the name to "Cheong Wa Dae" after he was inaugurated in 1960. The name was reportedly changed as it had ostensibly become associated with authoritarianism and dictatorship. An alternate name "Hwaryeongdae" was proposed alongside "Cheong Wa Dae" as a possible renaming candidate, but the latter was ultimately chosen.

In January 1968, North Korean infiltrators nearly reached the building in a bid to assassinate President Park Chung-hee during the Blue House raid. In the ensuing melee, 28 North Koreans, 26 South Koreans and four Americans were killed.

On 26 October 1979 Park was assassinated by the Korean Central Intelligence Agency (KCIA) Director in a safehouse in the Blue House grounds.

Presidents Park, Choi Kyu-ha, and Chun Doo-hwan used the building both as their office and official residence. While President Roh Tae-woo was in office, a new office building, official residence and press center, called Chunchu-gwan, were built. The main office building was opened in April 1991. In 1993 during Kim Young-sam's presidency, the building built by Japan for the then-official residence was dismantled.

Present
On 20 March 2022, South Korea's President-elect Yoon Suk-yeol announced that he would take office on May 10 in the Ministry of National Defense building in the Yongsan District of Seoul, and open the Blue House to the public as a park. In May 2022, in accordance with order issued by Yoon Suk-yeol after he took office, the building officially converted into a public park and opened to public visitation for the first time in its 74 year history, with a maximum of 39,000 visitors allowed on a daily basis. The visitors will be able to witness cultural performances, tours, and even hiking trails that lead to Bugak Mountain, Cheongwadae’s scenic backdrop.

The Government of South Korea allocated ₩36 billion (about $29.5 million) from government reserve funds for the purpose of relocation of the office. However this move of relocating the presidential office and the defence ministry at a time was critiqued saying that it had implications for national security along with cost and others worrying about issues like increased nuclear activity in North Korea and post-pandemic economic recovery. While a recent survey revealed that 58% of the people opposed this move.

Setting

Geomancers have long considered the area in which Cheong Wa Dae is located as an auspicious location. This view was backed up by an inscription on a stone wall that reads: "The Most Blessed Place on Earth", found behind the official presidential residence during the construction of a new building in 1990. Others contend that it is cursed, due to the misfortunes that has befallen on its previous occupants.

To the north is the mountain Bukhansan, flanked by two mountains, Naksan, symbolizing the Azure Dragon, on the left and Inwangsan, symbolizing the White Tiger, on the right. To the south is Namsan, the protective mountain of the capital.  In front flow the Cheonggyecheon stream and Han River.

Logos
The Blue House logo was first enacted in 1995 during the Kim Young-sam administration, and the logo was modified in 2005 during the Roh Moo-hyun administration. In 2008, with the inauguration of Lee Myung-bak government, a new logo was released. In 2013, a new logo was released with the launch of Park Geun-hye's government, and was used until the end of Moon Jae-in's government in 2022.

In popular culture
2009, Iris (KBS TV drama)
2010, Big Thing (SBS TV drama)
2011, City Hunter (SBS TV drama)
2013, King of Ambition (SBS TV drama)
2015, Assembly (KBS TV drama)
2019, Vagabond (SBS TV drama)
2019, Designated Survivor: 60 Days (tvN TV drama)

See also
 

Korean architecture
History of South Korea
History of Korea
Presidential Residence of South Korea
Korea National Assembly Proceeding Hall
Residences of North Korean leaders - the northern equivalent in the Democratic People's Republic of Korea

References

External links
 Office of the President 
 Blue House entry in Visit Korea 

Official residences in South Korea
Buildings and structures in Seoul
Presidential residences
Residential buildings completed in 1991
1991 establishments in South Korea
Jongno District
Parks in Seoul
Tourist attractions in Seoul
20th-century architecture in South Korea